Club Deportivo Anaitasuna is a Spanish football team based in Azkoitia, in the Autonomous Community of the Basque Country. Founded in 1934, it plays in the Tercera División RFEF – Group 4, holding home games at Campo Txerloia which has a capacity of 1,500 spectators. The team's name in Basque means brotherhood. Their closest rivals are Lagun Onak from Azpeitia.

History
Having won the Campeonato de Aficionados (national amateur cup) in 1973, their most successful period was in the 1980s when they were members of the Tercera División across the decade. In 1980–81 and 1982–83, their 6th-place league finish earned entry to the following season's Copa del Rey. Since then they have mostly played at provincial level, being promoted as the Gipuzkoa league winners four times (1993, 2001, 2012, 2016) but being relegated back down immediately on each occasion. They went up again in 2020, and also played in the 2020–21 Copa del Rey, losing to top-tier regulars Getafe CF only via a penalty in stoppage time.

The club has youth sections and a women's team (who finished 6th in Spain in 1994–95), and also competes in several other sports.

Season to season

21 seasons in Tercera División
1 season in Tercera División RFEF

References

External links
Official website 
Futbolme team profile 

Football clubs in the Basque Country (autonomous community)
Association football clubs established in 1934
1934 establishments in Spain
Sport in Gipuzkoa